Elhadj Ousmane Barry (born 27 September 1991), also known as Pato, is a Guinean international footballer who plays for Al-Okhdood as a centre forward.

Club career
Barry has played club football in Guinea and Tunisia for Horoya and Étoile du Sahel.

In July 2012, the player was on trial with JK Tammeka Tartu and signed a contract with the club at the end of the month. Barry made the debut for the team on 29 September, when he was substituted in during the second half and scored his first goal just five minutes later. On 21 October 2012, Pato scored a hat-trick in a relegation battle against JK Tallinna Kalev and helped his team to a 4–1 victory. A few days later he signed a new three-year contract with the club.

In January 2013, he joined Greek side Kavala on loan until the end of the 2012–13 season.

Barry joined Greek club Panachaiki in December 2013 and his contract with the club was extended in September 2014. On July 24, 2015, he signed a 3-years contract and moved to AE Larissa. On 29 June 2016, Pato left the club by mutual agreement.

He moved to Saudi club Al-Hazem in 2018. Later that year he moved to Al-Orobah. In early 2019 he moved to Abha. Later that year he moved to Al-Bukayriyah. On 23 September 2020, Barry joined Al-Hazem. On 17 August 2021, Barry joined Al-Wehda. On 1 July 2022, Barry joined Al-Okhdood.

International career
He made his international debut for Guinea in 2011, and participated at the 2012 Africa Cup of Nations.

Honours

Club
Abha
MS League: 2018–19

Al-Hazem
MS League: 2020–21

Individual
MS League top scorer: 2019–20

References

1991 births
Living people
Sportspeople from Conakry
Guinean footballers
Guinea international footballers
2012 Africa Cup of Nations players
Association football forwards
Étoile Sportive du Sahel players
Tartu JK Tammeka players
Meistriliiga players
Kavala F.C. players
Kecskeméti TE players
Al-Hazem F.C. players
Al-Orobah FC players
Abha Club players
Al-Bukayriyah FC players
Al-Wehda Club (Mecca) players
Al-Okhdood Club players
Saudi First Division League players
Guinean expatriate footballers
Expatriate footballers in Tunisia
Expatriate footballers in Estonia
Expatriate footballers in Greece
Expatriate footballers in Hungary
Expatriate footballers in Saudi Arabia
Guinean expatriate sportspeople in Tunisia
Guinean expatriate sportspeople in Estonia
Guinean expatriate sportspeople in Greece
Guinean expatriate sportspeople in Hungary
Guinean expatriate sportspeople in Saudi Arabia
Horoya AC players